Stanley M. Isaacs (1882–1962) was a Republican politician from New York City who served as Manhattan Borough President from 1938 to 1941 and later as a member of the New York City Council from 1942 to 1962. He was Minority Leader of the Council from 1950 to 1962. An advocate for social justice, Isaacs is perhaps best known for his support for housing and the work he did with Mayor Fiorello LaGuardia, whom he helped to get elected.

A graduate of both Columbia College and New York Law School, Isaacs was born in Manhattan to a family of English-Jewish descent. His paternal grandfather, Samuel Myer Isaacs, was rabbi at Temple Shaaray Tefila. His father, Myer S. Isaacs, along with his grandfather, published The Jewish Messenger.

References 

1882 births
1962 deaths
20th-century American lawyers
American people of English-Jewish descent
Columbia College (New York) alumni
Housing reformers
New York City Council members
New York Law School alumni
New York (state) Republicans
People from Manhattan
20th-century American politicians